The HongWell i-Tower, or HonHui i-Tower, is a , 39-storey skyscraper office building located in Xinzhuang District, New Taipei, Taiwan. The building was completed in the first quarter of 2021 and became the sixth tallest building in New Taipei. The building is composed of a podium and a tower. The first to third floors of the podium is a department store and the rest are parking spaces. The main tower is used for office spaces, where the topmost floor will house a Japanese restaurant.

Design
The exterior design is a modern style building, featuring simplicity and refinement. The volume of the tower is divided into four separate block shapes to emphasize the uprightness of the building. The external wall groove design method avoids the monotony caused by the towering volume, and uses this design to shape the night lighting effect. The exterior wall adopts modern glass façade, which adopts a minimalist design by being connected in a modular fashion to create a new landmark in the city.

See also 
 List of tallest buildings in Taiwan
 List of tallest buildings in New Taipei City

References

2021 establishments in Taiwan
Office buildings completed in 2021
Skyscraper office buildings in New Taipei